Donna Jean Turnbow (born c. 1961) is an American former gymnast who was US all-around national champion in 1977. She reached the top score at the September 1978 trials that selected the American team for the 1978 World Artistic Gymnastics Championships.

References

American female artistic gymnasts
1960s births
Living people
21st-century American women